Boyers is an unincorporated village in Marion Township, Butler County, Pennsylvania, United States.  It has a small population with a few businesses located in the center of the town.  Slippery Rock Creek flows through the community.  The creek's source is a few miles to the east, in the small village of Hilliards.  Pennsylvania Route 308 is one of the main roads in the area, running through the center of Boyers.

History 
Boyers was a large mining community at the turn of the 20th century, serviced by a branch of the Bessemer and Lake Erie Railroad known as the Hilliards branch.  The rails were removed in the early 2000s.

The abandoned mines have provided opportunities for underground storage facilities since 1954.  The Iron Mountain Corporation merged with the longtime owner of the facility in 1998 and operates a large storage facility located in a former limestone mine close to Boyers, where the Corbis photographic collection is stored.

The United States Office of Personnel Management (OPM) maintains a highly secure facility in an abandoned mine in Boyers which contains all the documents from security clearance proceedings.  OPM also operates its processing center for retired Federal employees in Boyers.

The United States Patent and Trademark Office stores original records in an underground storage facility in Boyers.

References

External links 
1895 history of Butler County, and Boyers area

Pittsburgh metropolitan area
Unincorporated communities in Butler County, Pennsylvania
Unincorporated communities in Pennsylvania